The Walnut Park Historic District is located in the University Hill neighborhood of Syracuse, New York, adjacent to the Syracuse University campus.  The district was added to the National Register of Historic Places in 1983.

Walnut Park

The park was deeded to the city in 1870 by prominent citizen George F. Comstock. Walnut Park is itself a three-block long park. The long sides of the park are bordered on the west by Walnut Place, on the east by Walnut Avenue. Cross streets are Harrison Street, Adams Street, Marshall Street, and Waverly Avenue from north to south. The park was originally landscaped with shade trees, but the Dutch Elm disease wiped out that overall effect in the 1950s.  In 1972, new trees were planted. These trees have reached maturity and restored some of the original atmosphere to the park.

Establishment of the neighborhood

The neighborhood surrounding Walnut Park was originally established by some of the social elite of Syracuse. Community leader and banker George Comstock, after donating the property for the park, chose carefully the people to whom he sold building lots.

George H. Bond had the house at 304 Walnut Place built in 1899. He was Onondaga County District Attorney, and founder of the still existent law firm of Bond, Schoeneck and King. The house reflects elements of both the Queen Anne style popular up to that time and the Georgian Revival style becoming popular. The house was later owned by Syracuse University and known as "Blackwell Cottage".  It is now the home of Alpha Tau Omega fraternity.

The house at 701 Walnut Place is now owned by Syracuse University and utilized as the Chancellor's residence. It was built for attorney William Nottingham in 1901. The house was designed in the Jacobethan Revival style by architects Brockway and Benson of New York City. Leather lines the library walls. The living room ceiling is decorated with Gothic tracery. The central staircase is carved. A ballroom graces the third floor.

The chateauesque house next door at 703 Walnut Avenue was built for Crucible Steel owner and president Horace Wilkinson in 1905. Gaggin and Gaggin architects of Syracuse designed it. The interior woodworking is various and impressive. Theodore Roosevelt, while engaged in the Barnes-Roosevelt libel case, stayed there as a guest of the family for a month. The house belonged to Phi Delta Theta Fraternity for many years and now belongs to Delta Kappa Epsilon Fraternity, of which American radio and television personality Dick Clark was a member.

Other notable Syracusans who built their homes in the neighborhood included clergyman and archbishop the Reverend Huntington, A. E. Nettleton, of the Nettleton Shoe Company and Paragon Plaster, and the Denison family.

Fraternity-sorority row

In 1915 the Alpha Phi sorority bought the house at 308 Walnut Place.  Around 1921 the houses at 208 and 210 Walnut Place and the one at 901 Walnut Avenue all became sorority or fraternity houses.  In 1923 house at 300 Walnut Place was sold to the Delta Delta Delta sorority.  The house at 310 Walnut Place was built around 1925 for the Sigma Phi Epsilon fraternity and the house at 803 Walnut Avenue was built for Gamma Phi Beta sorority.  In 1928, Kappa Alpha Theta sorority had local architect Marjorie Wright design their Tudor style house at 306 Walnut Place.   In 1937 the house at 907 Walnut Avenue also became the Kappa Delta sorority house.  Over the following decades, more fraternities and sororities moved in, making the area the Fraternity/Sorority Row of Syracuse University.

Block party

Walnut Park was the traditional home of Syracuse University's "block party", an event celebrating the coming of spring with live entertainment in an outdoor setting.  In 1993, amid concerns of over-crowding and excessive drinking, the University moved the event to a more readily controllable indoor venue.

Walnut Park Historic District contributing properties

See also 
 National Register of Historic Places listings in Syracuse, New York
 Sherbrook Apartments (Syracuse, New York)
 Ward Wellington Ward

References

Historic districts in Onondaga County, New York
Colonial Revival architecture in New York (state)
Syracuse University
Historic districts on the National Register of Historic Places in New York (state)
National Register of Historic Places in Syracuse, New York